Cyclohexadiene may refer to:

 1,3-Cyclohexadiene, 
 1,4-Cyclohexadiene,

See also
 Benzene or its theoretical isomer 1,3,5-Cyclohexatriene 
 Cyclohexene